The Gulabi Gang (from Hindi gulabi, "pink") is a vigilante group. The group first appeared in Banda district, Uttar Pradesh, as a response to widespread domestic abuse and other violence against women. Sampat Pal Devi started the Gulabi Gang in 2006. 

The group consists of women between 18 and 60 years old. It is reported to have spread since 2010, and it has been active across North India, both on the streets and in local politics.

Background 

The Gulabi Gang is officially headquartered in Badausa in Banda district, Uttar Pradesh. As of 2003, the district was ranked 154th on the Planning Commission's list of 447 districts based on an index of backwardness. The district has an abundant Dalit (untouchable caste) population which is subjected to discrimination by people from everywhere.

Description 
Sampat Pal Devi founded the Gulabi Gang in 2006 in response to the lack of police support for victims of domestic violence. Most, if not all, are members of lower castes. The gang focuses its attention on India's most impoverished region, with about half of its population facing poverty, lack of education, and other concerns. The gang fights for the rights of women regardless of their caste. There are also male members, such as Jai Prakash Shivhari, who joined to stand in solidarity against issues like government corruption, child marriages, and dowry deaths. In 2010, the Women's Reservation Bill was enacted which helped reserve 33 percent of parliamentary seats for women, but the Gulabi Gang still operated because they saw immediate results. The Gulabi cites that even female politicians can be corrupted. They prefer vigilante justice instead of working with politicians as well, with Pal noting that they can maintain their own good work so they will not be taken for granted by the state while also preferring to work on their own rather than with government organizations. Some gang members are unemployed, some are agricultural workers, and some make their living in jobs set up through self-help groups. These jobs include selling vegetables, sewing, or trading other commodities. Al Jazeera reported that the group has an estimated 400,000 members as of 2014; the Hindustan Times put the figure at 270,000. 

Pal explains they are not a gang in the typical sense, but are a "gang for justice." She credits her upbringing for inspiring her sense of justice when she was married off at the age of 12 years old, however, on 2 March 2014, Pal was relieved of her role at the head of the Gulabi Gang amid allegations of financial impropriety and putting her personal interests before those of the group. Pal denied these allegations and still has some involvement in the gang.

The Gang has several stations set up and each station has a head of a section called the 'commander', who handles daily activities and smaller problems of people on her own. She sends regular updates and reports larger problems to the leader of the Gang. Word of mouth and newspaper articles about the Gang's actions are its main source of advertisement. Abused women who hear about it narrate their stories to the group. The first step is to request the police to take charge. If this fails, the Gang takes over. At the formation of the gang, force and violence were used against the police and government, however, the local police claim "the gang is doing some good work and in a way helping us solve issues."

There is no discrimination based on gender because the gang not only focuses on male jurisdiction over women, but also on human rights and male oppression. Members of the Gulabi Gang were increasingly being asked by men to support local activism. When 7000 Banda farmers protested in the streets to demand compensation for failed crops, the men asked the Gulabi Gang to attend. Community service efforts of the gang include food and grain distribution to villagers in rural areas, pension to widows who do not have the means to support themselves in their old age, and helping prevent the abuse of women and children. The Gulabi Gang also teaches women self-defence and how to be economically self-sufficient.

The Gulabi Gang earned the Kelvinator 11th GR8! Women Award, an award offered by the Indian Television Academy. They also earned the Godfrey Phillips Bravery Award for social bravery, offered in Uttar Pradesh, Uttarakhand, and Delhi.

Corporate partnerships of the Gulabi Gang include Vitalect, a technology and services company that works with non-profit organisations to assist them with their technological needs, and Social Solution India (SSI), a non-profit company that promotes NGO stability

Incidents 
In June 2007, Pal heard that government-run fair-price shops were not distributing food and grains to the villagers as they should. She led the gang to observe the shop undercover and they collected evidence and discovered that trucks were shipping the shop's grains to open markets. Pal and the gang reported the evidence to local authorities and demanded that the grain be returned to the fair-price shops. The local authorities ignored their complaints but the reputation of the Gang was bolstered.

In 2008, they stormed an electricity office in Banda district and forced officials to turn the power back on, which they had cut to extract bribes. They have also stopped some child marriages and protested dowry and female illiteracy. In 2007, a Dalit woman was raped by a man of a higher caste and the incident went unreported. The villagers and members of the lower caste protested to no avail and many of them were put into prison for doing so. The Gulabi Gang took action, charged into the police station and attempted to free the villagers who were put into prison for protesting. They also demanded that a case be made against the rapist and when the policeman refused to make a case, they resorted to violence and physically attacked him. From that time, the Gulabi Gang was known to use physical violence if needed to make a point and if physical violence was of no use, then they would resort to publicly shaming the offender. Despite becoming popular for its violent approach to much of its activism, it also uses non-violent tactics such as marches and occupations.

In 2011, the gang helped Sheelu Nishad, a 17-year-old girl who had been gang raped. Nishad was arrested after arriving to the police station to file a report. The rapists, which also included a member of legislature, arrived to the police station first and requested her arrest. The victim's father approached the Gulabi Gang who in turn organised two mass demonstrations in front of the police station and legislator's house.

Pal has said that "Yes, we fight rapists with lathis [large bamboo sticks]. If we find the culprit, we thrash him black and blue so he dare not attempt to do wrong to any girl or a woman again." Suman Singh, a later commander of the gang, mentioned that when "a woman seeks the membership of Gulabi Gang, it is because she has suffered injustice, has been oppressed and does not see any other recourse. All our women can stand up to the men and if need be seek retribution through lathis."

Education 
One goal Sampat Pal had was to alleviate the illiteracy among young women. In 2008, a school was created in Banda, where at least 400 girls attended.

In popular culture 
 The Gulabi gang is the subject of the 2010 movie Pink Saris by Kim Longinotto as is the 2012 documentary Gulabi Gang by Nishtha Jain.
 Initially, it was reported that the Bollywood film, Gulaab Gang, starring Madhuri Dixit and Juhi Chawla as leads, was based on Sampat Pal's life, but the director denied this, saying that he admired her work but that the movie was not based on her life.
 In 2013, a book was published about the Gang's origins and work, called "Pink Sari Revolution: A Tale of Women and Power in India."
 The Gulabi Gang is featured in the 2017 song Des fleurs et des flammes by French singer Tal from her album Tal.
 The Gulabi Gang is featured in N.H. Senzai's novel, Ticket to India.

See also 
 Bhumata Brigade
 Lathi khela — martial art using lathi sticks
 Red Brigade Lucknow
 Sari Squad

References

Further reading

External links 
 Gulabi Gang website
Parivartan Kendra

Vigilantes
Indian women activists
Violence against women in India
Domestic violence-related organizations
Women's organisations based in India
Social history of India
Banda district, India
Women from Uttar Pradesh
Women from Madhya Pradesh
Activists from Madhya Pradesh
Activists from Uttar Pradesh
Indian women's rights activists
21st-century Indian women
21st-century Indian people
20th-century Indian women
20th-century Indian people